Intelsat V F-6, then named Intelsat 506, was a communications satellite operated by COMSAT. Launched in 1983, it was the sixth of fifteen Intelsat V satellites to be launched. The Intelsat V series was constructed by Ford Aerospace, based on the Intelsat V satellite bus. Intelsat V F-6 was part of an advanced series of satellites designed to provide greater telecommunications capacity for INTELSAT's global network.

Satellite 
The Intelsat V F-6 satellite was box-shaped, measuring 1.66 by 2.1 by 1.77 metres; solar arrays spanned 15.9 metres tip to tip. The arrays, supplemented by nickel-hydrogen batteries during eclipse, provided 1800 watts of power. The payload housed 21 C-band and 4 Ku-band transponders. It could accommodate 15,000 two-way voice circuits and two TV channels simultaneously. It had a launch mass of 1928 kg. He also carried a Maritime Communications Services (MCS) package for INMARSAT. The satellite was deactivated in July 1998.

Launch 
The satellite was successfully launched into space on 19 May 1982 at 22:26:00 UTC, by means of an Atlas SLV-3D Centaur-D1AR vehicle from the Cape Canaveral Air Force Station, Florida, United States. It had a launch mass of 1928 kg.

See also 

 1983 in spaceflight

References 

Spacecraft launched in 1983
Intelsat satellites
1983 in spaceflight